SK Austria Kärnten was an Austrian association football club, from Klagenfurt, Carinthia.

History 
The club was formed on 1 June 2007 and took over the license of ASKÖ Pasching to play in the Austrian Football Bundesliga. SK Austria took over the former name of rivalling FC Kärnten (as well as several notable players and sponsors' funds). In June 2010, the club announced it was filing for bankruptcy and the city founded a new club, SK Austria Klagenfurt.

Stadium 
Austria Kärnten played its home games at Hypo-Arena in the south-west end of Klagenfurt.

Manager history 
  Walter Schachner (2007)
  Klaus Schmidt (2007–2008)
  Frank Schinkels (2008–2009)
  Jože Prelogar (2009–2010)

Notes

External links 
 Official Website

 
Association football clubs established in 2007
Association football clubs disestablished in 2010
Defunct football clubs in Austria
Sport in Klagenfurt
2007 establishments in Austria
2010 disestablishments in Austria